Rando Pettai (born on 12 October 1965 in Otepää) is an Estonian film director, film producer, caricaturist and cartoonist.

In 2005 he founded the film studio Pulldozer Film OÜ.

Selected filmography
 1984  Naksitrallid I (animated film; illustrator)
 2000	Vanad ja kobedad (television series; producer)
 2003  Vanad ja kobedad saavad jalad alla (feature film; producer) 
 2003	Õpetajate tuba (television series; producer)
 2003	Vanad ja kobedad saavad jalad alla (feature film; producer)
 2008	Saladused (television series; producer)
 2010	Kälimehed (television series; producer)
 2016	Savisaare protsess (television series; producer)

References

Living people
1965 births
Estonian film directors
Estonian film producers
Estonian caricaturists
Estonian cartoonists
Tallinn University alumni
People from Otepää